The Newark Airport Interchange is a massive interchange of Interstate 78, U.S. Route 1-9, U.S. Route 22, New Jersey Route 21, and Interstate 95 (the New Jersey Turnpike) at the northern edge of Newark Liberty International Airport in Newark, New Jersey.

Description
Exits 57 and 58 of I-78 take passengers to Newark Airport and Downtown Newark. At the eastern end of the interchange, I-78 enters toll barriers, crosses Interstate 95 and becomes the Newark Bay Extension of the New Jersey Turnpike. The eastern terminus of U.S. Route 22 and the southern terminus of Route 21 are both at the interchange. U.S. Route 1-9 passes through the interchange as well. The interchange provides access to Newark Liberty International Airport.

History
The Newark Interchange is a complex interchange in northeastern New Jersey that opened to the public on January 15, 1952. At the opening of the turnpike, the interchange provided access to the airport via U.S. Route 1-9. In 1956, the Port Authority of New York and New Jersey (operator of Newark Airport) and the New Jersey Turnpike Authority announced a $9 million improvement project to construct graded interchanges that would offer direct access to the airport. After the completion of Interstate 78 through the Newark area in the 1970s, it became part of the interchange complex.

See also

References

External links
NJ Freeways.com
U.S. Route 1 Straight Line Diagram from the New Jersey Department of Transportation
New Jersey Route 21 Straight Line Diagram from the New Jersey Department of Transportation
U.S. Route 22 Straight Line Diagram from the New Jersey Department of Transportation
Interstate 78 in New Jersey Straight Line Diagram from the New Jersey Department of Transportation

New Jersey
Transportation in Newark, New Jersey
Road interchanges in the United States
New Jersey Turnpike
Interstate 95
U.S. Route 1
U.S. Route 9
U.S. Route 22
Newark Liberty International Airport